Lieutenant General Jaswinder Singh Sandhu, PVSM, UYSM, AVSM, VSM was the Military Secretary of the Indian Army and assumed office on 15 December 2017. He was the 46th Commander, XV Corps of the Indian Army and was in office from 1 November 2016 to 14 December 2017. He assumed the post from Lt General Satish Dua and was succeeded by Lt General Anil Kumar Bhatt.

Early life and education 
Sandhu has attended the Higher Command Course at Army War College, Mhow; Defence Services Staff College, Wellington; and National Defence College, Delhi.

Career 
Sandhu was commissioned into 5 Gorkha Rifles. He has held various important command, staff and instructor appointments during his career. He has commanded an infantry battalion along the Line of Control; a mountain brigade and the 28th Infantry Division (Kupwara). He has a keen understanding of Jammu and Kashmir because he has served five times in the state. He has also served in the Indian Embassy at Kathmandu, Nepal.

During his career of over 36 years, he has been awarded the Vishist Seva Medal, Ati Vishisht Seva Medal (2015), Uttam Yudh Seva Medal (January 2018), and Param Vishisht Seva Medal in 2019. for his service.

Honours and decorations

References 

Living people
Indian generals
Recipients of the Vishisht Seva Medal
Indian Army officers
Recipients of the Ati Vishisht Seva Medal
Recipients of the Uttam Yudh Seva Medal
Year of birth missing (living people)
National Defence College, India alumni
Recipients of the Param Vishisht Seva Medal
Defence Services Staff College alumni